Baker Creek is a stream in Alberta, Canada.

Baker Creek has the name of an early figure in the local mining industry.

See also
List of rivers of Alberta

References

Rivers of Alberta